R152 road may refer to:
 R152 road (Ireland)
 R152 (Bangladesh)